The 2021–22 CAF Champions League (known as the 2021–22 TotalEnergies CAF Champions League for sponsorship purposes) was the 58th season of Africa's premier club football tournament organized by the Confederation of African Football (CAF), and the 26th season under the current CAF Champions League title.

Wydad Casablanca won their 3rd title with a 2–0 win against the defending champions, Al Ahly, in the final at Stade Mohammed V in Casablanca, Morocco, which hosted a second consecutive final. As winners, Wydad earned the right to play against RS Berkane, the winners of the 2021–22 CAF Confederation Cup, in the 2022 CAF Super Cup.

Association team allocation
A toal of 42 out of the 54 CAF member associations entered this season's CAF Champions League, with the 12 highest ranked associations according to their CAF 5-Year Ranking eligible to enter two teams in the competition. For this season, the CAF utilized the 2017–2021 CAF 5-Year Ranking, which calculated points for each entrant association based on their clubs’ performance over those 5 years in the CAF club competitions. The criteria for points were as follows:

The points were multiplied by a coefficient according to the year as follows:
2020–21: x 5
2019–20: × 4
2018–19: × 3
2018: × 2
2017: × 1

Teams
The following 54 teams from 42 out of the total 54 member associations entered this season's tournament.
Teams in 
Bold received a bye to the second round.
The other teams entered the first round.

Associations are shown according to their 2017–2021 CAF 5-Year Ranking – those with a ranking score have their rank and score (in parentheses) indicated.

 Associations which did not enter a team

Notes:

Schedule
The schedule for this season's edtition of the tournament were as follows:

Qualifying rounds

First round

Second round

Group stage

In the group stage, each group was played on a home-and-away round-robin basis. The winners and runners-up of each group advanced to the quarter-finals of the knockout stage.

Group A

Group B

Group C

Group D

Knockout stage

Bracket

Quarter-finals

Semi-finals

Final

Top goalscorers

See also
2021–22 CAF Confederation Cup

References

External links

2021–22
 
1
1